is a professional Japanese baseball player. He plays pitcher for the Orix Buffaloes.

References 

1994 births
Living people
Baseball people from Ehime Prefecture
Rikkyo University alumni
Japanese baseball players
Nippon Professional Baseball pitchers
Orix Buffaloes players
Chiba Lotte Marines players
People from Matsuyama, Ehime